Thamnoseris is a genus of plants in the dandelion tribe within the daisy family.

There is only one known species, Thamnoseris lacerata, commonly known as the pachycaul tree. It is endemic to the Desventuradas Islands in the South Pacific, part of the Republic of Chile.

References

Endemic flora of Chile
Asteraceae genera
Cichorieae
Desventuradas Islands